Gun Metal is a 3D shooting video game for the Xbox and Microsoft Windows where you take control of the fully transformable prototype combat vehicle. It was developed by the now defunct Rage Software Limited.

Story 
The game is based around a war (sometime in the future) on a planet called Helios, where humans have settled.  Enemy spacecraft have followed them from Earth and are attempting to exterminate the colony. Project Gunmetal is a massive operation which oversaw the creation of a supremely powerful war machine.  In its primary form, a walking "humanoid" mech many dozens of feet high, it possesses a range of 24 weapons and an electronic shield.  At the push of a button, it transforms into an advanced fighter jet reminiscent of a modern fighter jet.

Gameplay 
Gun Metal allows players to pilot a futuristic mech (named the Havoc Suit) which can transform into a plane (the Havoc Jet). The mech (and plane) can use various weapons in their loadout, about 4 can be used for both the mech and plane independently (8 in total). It possesses a total of 24 weapons to use, ranging from napalm, pulse cannons, harpoons and rockets.

Gun Metal contains 14 mission each with various objectives the player must complete in order to advance. As you progressing through the game, additional weapons are unlocked allowing the player with multiple loadout options, providing more replayability and alternative combat engagement.

Reception

The Xbox version received "mixed" reviews according to the review aggregation website Metacritic.

References

External links
 

2002 video games
Majesco Entertainment games
Video games about mecha
Strategy First games
Video games developed in the United Kingdom
Windows games
Xbox games
Rage Games games
Third-person shooters
Combat flight simulators
Single-player video games